The  ('suit of lights') is the traditional clothing that Spanish bullfighters (and ) wear in the bullring. The term originates from the sequins and reflective threads of gold or silver. These  are based on the flamboyant costumes of the 18th-century dandies and showmen involved in bullfighting, which later became exclusive to the bullfighting ritual. Later adornments include the  hat, more elaborate embroidery, and decorative accessories.

Getting "dressed to kill" constitutes a ceremonious ritual by itself: the matador is attended by a squire who helps him to get dressed, often  according to a "lucky" ritual in the privacy of a hotel room.

 : the hat that the bullfighter and his assistants (subalterns) wear. It may be offered to a spectator as a mark of honour following a tradition set by Paquiro (Francisco Montes Reina, a famous 19th-century ).
 : a narrow black necktie.
 : a short and rigid jacket, with shoulder reinforcements, attached only at the upper shoulder to allow the free and unimpeded movement of the arms.
 : two pairs of socks or stockings are used. The first pair are white cotton, and the external pair are silk. They are usually pink, but can also be white, red, or black.
 : flat slippers similar in general appearance to ballet flats, and decorated with a bow.
Before the main performance starts, this ornate cape is exchanged for a more utilitarian red or purple , a long cape used to entice the bull to charge. This has stiff reinforcing rods at the sides ( also means 'crutch' or 'cane' in Spanish).
 : A hair tie. In the 19th century, bullfighters wore long hair often secured in a bun (called a ) reminiscent of 18th-century wigs.

Colors 
The main elements of the traje de luces, the pants and jacket, are usually of the same color and embellished with gold, sometimes silver or black, embroidery, sequins, and Austrian knots. The choice of colors are at the discretion of the bullfighter, with the most common colors being red, blue, white, pink, and brown. A bullfighter may pick a color for aesthetic reasons or based on superstitions, e.g. wearing a color worn previously that led to success in a bullfight or avoiding a color completely due to serious injuries while wearing that certain color. Selecting certain colors can also be for practical reasons, like picking lighter colors to call less attention from the bull.

 : boots made of chamois, instead of the  slippers. Steel armour is worn on the right leg to avoid being gored (cornada) by the bull's horns.
 : a traditional beaver-fur hat.

are mounted lancers who slaughter the bull while riding on horseback.
The Spanish  use the traditional suit of Andalusian cattlemen, while their Portuguese counterparts dress in the style of Frederick II of Prussia, a fashion similar to the uniforms of upper-class cavalry in the 18th century.

Goyaesque corridas 
These bullfights celebrate the earliest versions of the modern ceremony, which evolved in the 18th century, and which were recorded by the painter Goya. The suit is similar to the conventional , but with less adornment. The   tights are more comfortable, being of silk with gold thread. It measures between 113 and 123 cm and weighs some 4 to 6 kg.

References

External links

Inventario web de trajes de luces 
Labeled diagram of a torero standing in his traje de luces 
assorted pictures of toreros in action 

Bullfighting
Spanish clothing